The Ellison–Cliffe Lecture is held annually by the Royal Society of Medicine. The lectures, which commenced in 1987, are named after Dr. Percy Cliffe and his wife, Dr. Carice Ellison, who endowed the lecture to be given on a subject connected with the contribution of fundamental science to the advancement of medicine.

The Lecturer is also awarded a medal in honour of their presentation.

The Lectures
 1987 Sir Walter Bodmer, on Genetics and Cancer
 1988 Charles D. Marsden
 1989 Dame Anne McLaren, on human conceptus
 1990 Sir Roy Calne
 1991 Lord George Porter
 1992 Sir Joseph Smith, on the Threat of new Infectious Diseases
 1993 Sir Colin Blakemore
 1994 Sir James Black
 1995 Dennis Lincoln
 1996 Roger H. Clarke, on Managing Radiation Risks
 1997 John Newsom-Davis
 1998 Marcus Pembrey
 1999 William P. Gray
 2000 Richard Frackowiak
 2001 A. Riley
 2002 A. Smith
 2003 Stephen T. Holgate CBE
 2004 Dame Julia Polak, on embryonic stem cells and tissue engineering 
 2005 Iain Hutchison
 2006 Jill Belch, Blood vessels: Not merely plumbing
 2007 Tony Ryan, on nanotechnology and the quest for motility
 2008 Chris Lavy
 2009 Andy Adam
 2010 Hugh Montgomery
 2011 Kevin Warwick, Neural Interfaces: An experimental tour
 2012 Kevin Fong, on Medicine for Mars
 2013 Philip Beales
 2014 Michael Hastings, on circadian body clocks
 2015 Paul Freemont, life is what you make it
 2016 Carl Philpott, Smell and taste - the senses that man forgot
 2017 Charles Swanton, Cancer evolution through space and time - The challenge of prolonging survival
 2018 Mustafa Suleyman, How AI is going to impact healthcare in the future
 2019 Guy Leschziner, Sleep medicine

See also
 List of medicine awards

References

Annual events in London
Awards established in 1987
British lecture series
British science and technology awards
Medical lecture series
Medicine awards
Royal Society of Medicine